The 1980 United States presidential election in Tennessee took place on November 4, 1980. All 50 states and The District of Columbia were part of the 1980 United States presidential election. Tennessee voters chose 10 electors to the Electoral College, who voted for president and vice president.

Tennessee was won by former California Governor Ronald Reagan (R) by a very slim margin of 0.29% and a margin of just 4,710 votes, partly because of President Jimmy Carter's southern roots. Amidst a national Republican landslide, Tennessee weighed in as 9.5 points more Democratic than the nation at-large, and Carter's 48.41% vote share has not been exceeded by any Democrat since (Bill Clinton would go on to carry the state with smaller pluralities in 1992 and 1996). Carter's strong performance given the national environment stands as a relative anomaly in Tennessee's recent electoral history; had he carried the state, it would have marked the only time since 1924 that a Republican was elected president without winning Tennessee.

Reagan’s victory was the first of three consecutive Republican victories in the state, as Tennessee would not vote Democratic again until Bill Clinton in 1992. Since then it has become a safely Republican state. , this is the last time that Tipton County voted for a Democratic presidential candidate, and the last time that a Republican carried Tennessee with a plurality, rather than a majority.

Results

Results by county

References

Tennessee
1980
1980 Tennessee elections